Manolis Perdikis (Greek: Μανώλης Περδίκης; born 29 August 1999) is a Greek professional footballer who plays as a centre-back for Super League 2 club Veria.

References

1999 births
Living people
Greek footballers
Super League Greece players
OFI Crete F.C. players
Veria NFC players
Association football defenders